Rafael Enrique Pérez Almeida (born 9 January 1990), commonly known as Rafa Pérez, is a Colombian professional footballer who plays as a centre-back for Talleres .

Club career

Early career
Born in Cartagena, Pérez made his senior debuts with Real Cartagena in 2008. In 2012, he moved abroad, signing with China League One team Chongqing Lifan, but returned to his home country only a year later, after agreeing to a deal with Independiente Medellín.

On 12 December 2013 Pérez moved to Independiente Santa Fe. On 26 May of the following year he joined Portuguesa, but only appeared rarely for Lusa.

Litex Lovech
On 11 January 2015, Pérez signed with Bulgarian side Litex Lovech, being given the number 5 jersey. He made his debut for the club on 28 February, playing the full 90 minutes in a 1–0 home win against Ludogorets Razgrad. On 12 December 2015, he was sent off after an altercation with Miguel Bedoya in a heated league match that was eventually abandoned after the Litex players were ordered off the pitch.

CSKA Sofia
In the summer of 2016 he joined CSKA Sofia. Pérez remained with the "redmen" until he cancelled his contract with the team in May 2017.

Atlético Junior
On 2 June 2017, after Pérez had officially parted company with CSKA Sofia, he joined Atlético Junior.

Honours

Club
Real Cartagena
Primera B (1): 2008

Junior
Copa Colombia (1): 2017

References

External links
 
 
 
 

1990 births
Living people
Colombian footballers
Sportspeople from Cartagena, Colombia
Real Cartagena footballers
Independiente Medellín footballers
Independiente Santa Fe footballers
Campeonato Brasileiro Série B players
Associação Portuguesa de Desportos players
First Professional Football League (Bulgaria) players
China League One players
Categoría Primera A players
PFC Litex Lovech players
PFC CSKA Sofia players
Atlético Junior footballers
Talleres de Córdoba footballers
Colombian expatriate footballers
Colombian expatriate sportspeople in Brazil
Colombian expatriate sportspeople in Bulgaria
Colombian expatriate sportspeople in Argentina
Expatriate footballers in China
Expatriate footballers in Brazil
Expatriate footballers in Bulgaria
Expatriate footballers in Argentina
Association football defenders